Chinese jump rope (Chinese: 跳皮筋; pinyin: tiàopíjīn), also known as Chinese ropes, jumpsies, elastics (British English: Australia, New Zealand, Great Britain), yoki (Canada),Super Cali (Newfoundland), French skipping, American ropes/Chinese ropes (in Scotland), (in German) gummitwist, "jeu de l elastique" in France and Chinese garter in the Philippines is a children's game resembling hopscotch and jump rope. Various moves (creation of positions or figures) are combined to create patterns which are often accompanied by chants.

The game is typically played by three or more players using a string of rubber bands that has been tied into a circle, usually at least six feet long ("approximately 2 feet in diameter"), or an elastic rope. Two of the participants (the holders) face each other several feet apart, and position the string around their ankles so that it is taut. The third player (the jumper) stands between the two sides of the rope and must accomplish a series of increasingly difficult moves without making an error. The position of the string is raised as the jumper moves through the levels, from ankle to waist height and higher. "They are great for stretching. Often a child gets so intrigued with the shapes the rope can make that [the child] stretches much harder than [the child] would have otherwise."


Moves, patterns, and chants

The game begins with choosing the jump pattern to follow and with the holders holding the rubberband around their ankles. There are many jump patterns and most are accompanied by a song. This is sometimes called the "first level". The jumper tries to complete the chosen pattern. If the moves are completed successfully, then the rope is moved farther up and the series is repeated. When the rope gets too high for a normal person to jump over it, the player then kneels and uses his or her hands instead. Some people just stop the game at this point, as the game is much easier when using hands. If the jumper makes a mistake, players rotate their positions and the next player becomes the jumper. Once the player is finished, that person switches with one of the other people, and so on much, until everyone has been able to play.

The moves involve jumping and repositioning the feet in some manner. Some of the more common moves are jumping so that both feet land outside the rope, both are inside the rope, one is inside and one is outside, or both are on top of the rope. These moves are called "out" (it may be thought of as "straddling".), "in", "side", and "on" respectively, which the two other participants chant as the player executes them. Some other, less common, moves involve manipulating the rope. A "pull" is when the jumper carries a side of the rope with one's foot or feet, generally crossing it over the other side. Crossing the ropes with one's legs in between them is "diamonds". One of these moves, called "scissors", is executed by starting with both feet outside the rope and then crossing the legs, with the ropes in tow, so that a formation resembling a pair of scissors is formed. The pattern "Chinese" features:

There are many variations of the game that are played. Sometimes the rope is criss-crossed so that it makes an X, and the player must move his or her feet into different sections of the X in some pattern. Instead of simply raising the rope, some players create a procession of "levels", similar to a video game, that the player must complete before winning the game. When a player returns to jumping, they continue the game from the last uncompleted level. The player that first completes the levels (usually five to nine, up to neck height) wins the game. These levels often have specific names, such as the "roller coaster," which is a criss-crossed rope that is higher at one end than the other. There is a pattern known as "American" and one known as "the Name Game".

There are many rhymes used when playing, for example:
"England, Ireland, Scotland, Wales
Inside, outside
Inside on" (also "Puppy dogs' tails")

Several counting chants are used, such as:
Old Mrs Mason broke her basin
On the way to London Station.
How much did it cost?
One, two, three, four.[..]
and
Charlie Chaplin sat on a pin
How many inches did it go in?
One, two, three, four.[..]
as well as

Cinderella, dressed in yella (yellow)
went up stairs to kiss a fella (fellow)
she made a mistake and kissed a snake
how many doctors did it take?
one, two, three, four...
(circa 4th grade, 2004, California, USA)

The following pattern is from the Keystone Folklore Quarterly (1966):

German chants
"Hau-Ruck": Hau Ruck Donald Duck Micky Maus Mitte Raus (trans.: Jerk Chuck, Donald Duck, Mickey Mouse, inside out)
"Sahne": Sahne Sahne Mitte Grätsche Mitte Raus (trans.: Cream, cream, inside, outside, inside, out)
"Däumling": Däumeling ist klein wie ein Daumen Raus (trans.: Tom Thumb is as small as a thumb-nail)
"Zitronenschale": Zi-tro-nen-scha-le Raus (trans.: Le-mon, cit-rus, peel, out)
"Schneewittchen": Schnee-witt-chen und die eins, zwei, drei, vier, fünf, sechs, sieben Zwerge Raus (trans.: Snow White along with the one, two, three, four, five, six, seven Dwarves, out)

See also
Tinikling

References

Further reading
Marty, Sheree S. (1994). Chinese Jump Rope. Sterling. .

External links
 GummiTwist.ch, Swiss site devoted entirely to Chinese jump rope (language-agnostic instruction images)

Girls' toys and games